Adenosylcobalamin (AdoCbl), also known as coenzyme B12, cobamamide, and dibencozide, is, along with methylcobalamin (MeCbl), one of the biologically active forms of vitamin B12.

Adenosylcobalamin participates as a cofactor in radical-mediated 1,2-carbon skeleton rearrangements. These processes require the formation of the deoxyadenosyl radical through homolytic dissociation of the carbon-cobalt bond. This bond is exceptionally weak, with a bond dissociation energy of 31 kcal/mol, which is further lowered in the chemical environment of an enzyme active site. An enzyme that uses adenosylcobalamin as a cofactor is methylmalonyl-CoA mutase (MCM).

Further experimentation has also determined adenosylcobalamin's role in regulating expression of some bacterial genes. By binding to CarH, AdoCbl can modulate carotenoid genes, which confer warm colors onto various plants. Carotenoid transcription is activated by sunlight, due to the response from AdoCbl. There are other photoreceptors across different bacterial communities, aside from CarH, that also have reactive capability when bound to AdoCbl. For instance, AerR is another factor that uses AdoCbl to give off purple pigmentation. Additional examination of  adenosylcobalamin-bound enzymes and the development of this cofactor over time may prove to hold regulatory function of DNA and RNA.

See also 
 Methylcobalamin
 Hydroxocobalamin
 Cyanocobalamin
 Vitamin B12
 Cobalamin biosynthesis
 Nitric oxide

References

External links 
 

B vitamins
Cofactors
Organocobalt compounds
Vitamers
Vitamin B12